Ganeyev or Ganeev (feminine: Ganeyeva, Ganeeva) is a surname. Notable people with the surname include:

Renal Ganeyev (born 1985), Russian fencer
Marat Ganeyev (born 1964), Russian cyclist
Vera Karmishina-Ganeeva (born 1988), Russian athlete

See also
Galeyev

Tatar-language surnames